Horsey Windpump is a windpump or drainage windmill in the care of the National Trust in the village of Horsey, on The Broads near Great Yarmouth, Norfolk, England. The structure is a grade II* listed building.

History 

The present structure was built in 1912 on the foundations of the 18th-century Horsey Black Mill.

The windpump was working until it was struck by lightning in 1943. It was acquired by the National Trust in 1948 from the Buxton Family and has been restored. The mill's damaged sails were removed in 1956, and replacement sails and fantail were installed in 1962. The Great Storm of 1987 caused further damage, and repair works were required before the building could reopen to visitors in 1990.

Having succumbed to the ravages of time and the elements, the sails were removed again in 2014. A restoration project started in 2016 to repair and reinstate the cap and sails, with the ambition of restoring the Windpump to full working order. Finally, after a four-month wait of unsuccessful tests in unfavourable wind, the sails eventually turned on the evening of Wednesday 29 May 2019 for the first time since 1943. This restoration work was awarded 'Building Conservation Project of the Year 2019' at The Royal Institution of Chartered Surveyors (RICS) regional awards.

But whilst the sails have now turned successfully, this was only the first step in testing the sails with more shutters needing to be added and putting them through their paces in different wind conditions. The hope is that the sails will be turning regularly for visitors later on in the year.

The Buxton family continue to manage the Horsey estate, emphasising nature conservation. Because of this, the estate has become an internationally important wildlife site. On the estate there are waymarked circular walks, the main one being the path via Brograve Mill; the walk provides great views across Horsey Mere and access to the beach at Horsey Gap. There are many windmills in this particular area, including West Somerton Mill, Heigham Holmes Mill, Brograve Mill, and Lambrigg Mill. Horsey Windpump is open daily from March to October.

References

External links
 Horsey Windpump information at the National Trust

Windmills in Norfolk
Grade II* listed buildings in Norfolk
National Trust properties in Norfolk
Grade II* listed windmills
Museums in Norfolk
Mill museums in England
Windmills of the Norfolk Broads
Tower mills in the United Kingdom
Windmills completed in 1912
North Norfolk
1912 establishments in England